The 1914 Kansas gubernatorial election was held on November 3, 1914. Republican nominee Arthur Capper defeated Democratic incumbent George H. Hodges with 39.67% of the vote.

General election

Candidates
Major party candidates 
Arthur Capper, Republican
George H. Hodges, Democratic

Other candidates
Henry Justin Allen, Progressive
Julius B. Billard, Independent
Milo M. Mitchell, Socialist
Silas W. Bond, Prohibition

Results

References

1914
Kansas
Gubernatorial